The Very Best of Joan Armatrading is a greatest hits album by Joan Armatrading, released in February 1991. It features a remix by Hugh Padgham of Love and Affection. The record peaked at number 9 in the UK albums chart and was certified Gold by the British Phonographic Industry.

Track listing

References 

Joan Armatrading albums
1991 greatest hits albums
A&M Records compilation albums